The Cave City Commercial District, in Cave City, Kentucky, is a historic district which was listed on the National Register of Historic Places in 1983.

It is located along Broadway between 1st and 2nd Streets in Cave City.

According to its NRHP nomination, the districthas significance as being the last intact section of a once architecturally cohesive and thriving business area. While not extremely important individually, as a group these commercial buildings signify the important economic growth which Cave City experienced during the last half of the 19th century.  Established in 1853, Cave City was a planned community, established primarily because of its proximity to the Mammoth Cave resort and the proposed Louisville and Nashville Railroad line. During that year four Louisville speculators purchased the
land for the town site. By 1860 the population had grown to one hundred and fifty.

The district was deemed to have "significance as being the last intact section of a once architecturally cohesive and thriving business area. While not extremely important individually, as a group these commercial buildings signify the important economic growth which Cave City experienced during the last half of the 19th century."

References

Historic districts on the National Register of Historic Places in Kentucky
National Register of Historic Places in Barren County, Kentucky
Commercial buildings on the National Register of Historic Places in Kentucky